In mathematics, the upper topology on a partially ordered set X is the coarsest topology in which the closure of a singleton   is the order section  for each  If  is a partial order, the upper topology is the least order consistent topology in which all open sets are up-sets.  However, not all up-sets must necessarily be open sets. The lower topology induced by the preorder is defined similarly in terms of the down-sets. The preorder inducing the upper topology is its specialization preorder, but the specialization preorder of the lower topology is opposite to the inducing preorder.

The real upper topology is most naturally defined on the upper-extended real line  by the system  of open sets. Similarly, the real lower topology  is naturally defined on the lower real line  A real function on a topological space is upper semi-continuous if and only if it is lower-continuous, i.e. is continuous with respect to the lower topology on the lower-extended line  Similarly, a function into the upper real line is lower semi-continuous if and only if it is upper-continuous, i.e. is continuous with respect to the upper topology on

See also

References

 
 
 

General topology
Order theory